The men's ISSF 25 meter rapid fire pistol was a shooting sports event held as part of the Shooting at the 1948 Summer Olympics programme. It was the eighth appearance of the event. The competition was held on 4 August 1948 at the shooting ranges at London. 59 shooters from 22 nations competed. Nations had been limited to three shooters each since the 1932 Games. The event was won by Károly Takács of Hungary, the nation's first medal in the event. Argentine Carlos Enrique Díaz Sáenz Valiente took silver, also his nation's first rapid fire pistol medal. Unlike Hungary and Argentina, Sweden was no stranger to the podium in this event; Sven Lundquist's bronze made it the fourth consecutive time that Sweden competed it earned a medal (Sweden had not had any rapid fire pistol shooters in 1920 or 1932, however).

Background

This was the eighth appearance of what had finally been standardised as the men's ISSF 25 meter rapid fire pistol event, the only event on the 2020 programme that traces back to 1896. The event has been held at every Summer Olympics except 1904 and 1928 (when no shooting events were held) and 1908; it was nominally open to women from 1968 to 1980, although very few women participated these years. There is no women's equivalent on the Olympic programme, as of 2021. The first five events were quite different, with some level of consistency finally beginning with the 1932 event—which, though it had differences from the 1924 competition, was roughly similar. The 1936 competition followed the 1932 one quite closely. The post-World War II event substantially altered the competition once again.

1936 bronze medalist Torsten Ullman of Sweden returned in 1948. The reigning (1947) world champion was Carlos Enrique Diaz Saenz Valiente.

Cuba, Lebanon, and Peru each made their debut in the event. The United States made its sixth appearance in the event, tied for most of any nation.

Common pistols were the Walther Olympia and the Beretta.

Competition format

The competition format was almost completely different from the 1924–1936 Games, and was now very close to the modern rapid fire pistol competition. Each shooter fired 60 shots. These were done in two courses of 30; each course consisted of two stages of 15; each stage consisted of three series of 5. In each stage, the time limit for each series was 8 seconds for the first, 6 seconds for the second, and 4 seconds for the third. 

A holdover from the previous Games was that full-body silhouettes, rather than round targets, continued to be used; however, scoring rings had been added so that now each shot was scored up to 10 rather than being strictly hit or miss. Targets were 1.60 metres tall and 45 centimetres wide. As in 1912, hits were the primary measurement of success; points were only used to differentiate between shooters with the same number of hits.

The pistol had to be of .22 calibre. No telescope sights were allowed. Bullet weight could not exceed 40 grains.

Records

Prior to the competition, the existing world and Olympic records were as follows.

Károly Takács broke the world record and set the initial Olympic record for the 60-shot format with a score of 580.

Schedule

Results

References

Shooting at the 1948 Summer Olympics
Men's 1948